The list of shipwrecks in 1860 includes ships sunk, foundered, grounded, or otherwise lost during 1860.

January

February

March

April

May

June

July

August

September

October

November

December

Unknown date

References

Notes

Bibliography
 Gaines, W. Craig, Encyclopedia of Civil War Shipwrecks, Louisiana State University Press, 2008 , .

1860
1860